Mönsterås Municipality (Mönsterås kommun) is a municipality in Kalmar County,  south-eastern Sweden, with its seat located in the town Mönsterås.

Mönsterås was an original market town köping, which in 1952 was united with the rural municipality by the same name. By the local government reform of 1971 it became a municipality of unitary type and amalgamated with Fliseryd and Ålem in 1974.

The municipal arms show the ridge which the town centre with its church has been situated on since the medieval age. The cross symbolizes the Knights Hospitallers, a monastic order that was built in the town in the fifteenth century and had a large influence on its development. It is an etymological design showing the origin of the name of the municipality: Mönster comes from monastery while ås means ridge.

Geography 
The coastal line is signified by an archipelago with some 300 islands and islets, whereof two are nature reserves. On the island farthest from land, the lighthouse of Dämman was built in 1873; an automatic lighthouse has replaced its function, but the house itself is visited by tourists and conferences.

The geography of the rest is by some parts covered with forests, as the Småland province generally is. There is also some agricultural areas closer to the sea. There are two rivers flowing through the municipality towards to sea: Emån and Alsterån, that designate the wildlife and geography.

Localities
There are 5 urban areas (also called a Tätort or locality) in Mönsterås Municipality.

In the table the localities are listed according to the size of the population as of December 31, 2007. The municipal seat is in bold characters.

References
Statistics Sweden

External links

Mönsterås Municipality - Official site

Municipalities of Kalmar County